Golden Tuning Fork is the English translation of the titles of the following music awards:

Diapason d'Or, France
Goldene Stimmgabel, Germany
Zolotoy Kamerton (Золотой камертон), Soviet Union